is a Japanese speed skater. She competed in two events at the 1976 Winter Olympics.

References

1954 births
Living people
Japanese female speed skaters
Olympic speed skaters of Japan
Speed skaters at the 1976 Winter Olympics
Sportspeople from  Nagano Prefecture